Bengkulu is a province of Indonesia. It is located on the southwest coast of Sumatra. It was formed on 18 November 1968 by separating out the former Bencoolen Residency area from the province of South Sumatra under Law No. 9 of 1967 and was finalized by Government Regulation No. 20 of 1968. Spread over 19,813 km2, it is bordered by the provinces of West Sumatra to the north, Jambi to the northeast, Lampung to the southeast, and South Sumatra to the east, and by the Indian Ocean to the northwest, south, southwest, and west.

Bengkulu is the 25th largest province by area; it is divided into nine regencies and the city of Bengkulu, the capital and the only independent city. Bengkulu is also the 26th largest province by population in Indonesia, with 1,715,518 inhabitants at the 2010 Census and 2,010,670 at the 2020 Census; the official estimate as at mid 2021 was 2,032,941. According to a release by Badan Pusat Statistik, it has the eleventh highest Human Development Index among the provinces, with a score of about 0.744 in 2013. By 2014, the province is positioned 28th highest in gross domestic product and 20th highest in life expectancy, 70.35 years.

Bengkulu also includes offshore Mega Island and Enggano Island in the Indian Ocean. Bengkulu has 525 kilometres of coastline along the Indian Ocean on its western side, from Dusun Baru Pelokan in Muko-Muko Regency to Tebing Nasal in Kaur Regency. Bengkulu has many natural resources such as coal and gold, and has big and potential geothermal resources. However, it is less developed than other provinces in Sumatra.

Etymology

Traditional sources suggest that the name Bengkulu or Bangkahulu derived from the word bangkai and hulu which means 'carcasses located in a stream'. According to the story, there was once a war between small kingdoms in Bengkulu, resulting in many casualties from both sides in the streams of Bengkulu. These casualties soon rotted as they were not buried, lying in river streams. This etymology is similar to the story of a war between the Majapahit Empire and the Pagaruyung Kingdom in Padang Sibusuk, an area once ruled by the Dharmasraya empire, which also derives the name Padang Sibusuk from casualties rotting on the battlefield. During the European colonial era, the region was known as Bencoolen or British Bencoolen.

History

The region was subject to the Buddhist Srivijaya empire in the 8th century. The Shailendra Kingdom and Singosari Kingdom succeeded the Srivijaya but it is unclear whether they spread their influence over Bengkulu. The Majapahit also had little influence over Bengkulu. There were only few smalls ‘kedatuan’ based on ethnicity such as in  Sungai Serut,  Selebar,  Pat Petulai, Balai Buntar, Sungai Lemau, Sekiris, Gedung Agung and Marau Riang.  It became a vassal region of the Banten Sultanate (from Western Java) in the early 15th century and since the 17th century was ruled by Minangkabau's Inderapura Sultanate (today's in Pesisir Selatan, West Sumatra Province).

The first European visitors to the area were the Portuguese, followed by the Dutch in 1596.  The English East India Company established a pepper-trading center and garrison at Bengkulu (Bencoolen) in 1685. In 1714 the British built Fort Marlborough, which still stands. The trading post was never profitable for the British, being hampered by a location which Europeans found unpleasant, and by an inability to find sufficient pepper to buy. It became an occasional port of call for the EIC's East Indiamen.

In 1785, the area was integrated into British Empire as Bencoolen, while the rest of Sumatra and most of the Indonesian archipelago was part of the Dutch East Indies. Sir Stamford Raffles was stationed as  Lieutenant-Governor of Bencoolen (the colony was subordinate at the time to the Bengal Presidency) from 1818 to 1824, enacting a number of reforms including the abolition of slavery, and the British presence left a number of monuments and forts in the area. Despite the difficulties of keeping control of the area while Dutch colonial power dominated the rest of Sumatra, the British persisted, maintaining their presence for roughly 140 years before ceding Bengkulu to the Dutch as part of the Anglo-Dutch Treaty of 1824 in exchange for Malacca. Bengkulu then remained part of the Dutch East Indies until the Japanese occupation in World War 2.

During Sukarno's imprisonment by the Dutch in the early 1930s, the future first president of Indonesia lived briefly in Bengkulu. Here he met his wife, Fatmawati, who bore him several children, one of whom, Megawati Sukarnoputri, became Indonesia's first female President. During early independence, Bengkulu was included in the older 'South Sumatera' Province with Lampung, the Bangka-Belitung Archipelago and what became South Sumatera itself, as a Residency. It finally gained its provincial status in 1968 as the 26th province (prior to the last province: East Timor).

Bengkulu lies near the Sunda Fault and is prone to earthquakes and tsunamis. The June 2000 Enggano earthquake killed at least 100 people. A recent report predicts that Bengkulu is "at risk of inundation over the next few decades from undersea earthquakes predicted along the coast of Sumatra" A series of earthquakes struck Bengkulu during September 2007, killing 13 people.

Geography and climate

The western part of Bengkulu province, bordering the Indian Ocean coast, is about 576 km along, and the eastern part of the condition is hilly with a plateau that is prone to erosion. Bengkulu Province is on the west side of the Bukit Barisan mountains. The province's area is about 19,788.7 square kilometers. The province extends from the border province of West Sumatra to the border province of Lampung; the distance is about 567 kilometers. Bengkulu Province lies between 2° 16' S and 03° 31' S latitude and 101° 01'-103° 41'E longitude. Bengkulu province in the north bordering the province of West Sumatra, in the southern Indian Ocean and Lampung province, in the west bordering the Indian Ocean and in the east with the province of Jambi and South Sumatra Province.Bengkulu province bordered by the Indian Ocean coastline of approximately 525 kilometers. Its western part is hilly with fertile plateaus, while the western part is lowland relatively narrow, elongated from north to south and punctuated bumpy areas.

Bengkulu's climate is classified as tropical. Bengkulu has a large amount of rainfall throughout the year, even in the driest month. The climate here is classified as Af by the Köppen-Geiger system. The annual average temperature is 26.8 °C. The average annual rainfall is 3360 mm.

The total area of Bengkulu province is 19,919.33 km2. For administrative purposes, the province is divided into nine regencies and one city, together sub-divided into 93 districts.

Population

The 2010 census reported a population of 1,715,518 including 875,663 males and 837,730 females; by the 2020 Census this had risen to 2,010,670, and the official estimate for mid 2021 was 2,032,942.

Ethnic groups

Bengkulu is home to various indigenous ethnic groups. The Rejangs form the majority of the province with 60,4% of the population. The second largest ethnic group is the Javanese forming around 24%. Other minority indigenous ethnic groups includes Lembak, Serawai, Pekal, Enggano, Pasemah, Minangkabau and Malays. There is also non-indigenous ethnic groups that mostly came from other parts of Indonesia such as Sundanese, Javanese, Acehnese, Madurese, Batak, Chinese and others.

Religion

The 2010 census found 97.29% of the population as adherents to Islam and 2.04% as Christian. The remainder includes Hindus (0.22%) who are mostly Balinese migrants, Buddhists (0.13%), and "other" including traditional beliefs (0.32%).

Languages
Like the rest of Indonesia, Indonesian is the official language for formal occasions, institutions, and government affairs while local languages are widely used in daily life.

Most indigenous languages in Bengkulu belong to the Malayan group of Austronesian languages, such as Bengkulu Malay, Lembak, Pekal and Minangkabau varieties. The most widely spoken language in the province, Rejang, is the only Bornean language to be spoken in Sumatra (and one of three outside of Borneo other than Malagasy in Madagascar and Yakan in Basilan).

Engganese is classified as a highly divergent branch of Malayo-Polynesian, however, this is still  debated.. A less-studied language is Nasal language, which may be related to Rejang or form its own branch of Malayo-Polynesian. Non-indigenous ethnic groups also speak their own language/dialects.

Administrative divisions

Bengkulu Province is subdivided into nine regencies and the independent city of Bengkulu, which lies outside any regency. The regencies and city are listed below with their areas and their populations at the 2010 and 2020 Censuses, together with the official estimates as at mid 2021.

Economy
Three active coal mining companies produce between 200,000 and 400,000 tons of coal per year, which is exported to Malaysia, Singapore, South Asia, and East Asia. Fishing, particularly tuna and mackerel, is an important activity. Agricultural products exported by the province include ginger, bamboo shoots, and rubber.

See also

 List of people from Bengkulu

Notes

References
Reid, Anthony (ed.). 1995. Witnesses to Sumatra: A traveller's anthology. Kuala Lumpur: Oxford University Press. pp. 125–133.
Reprints of British-era primary source material
Wilkinson, R.J. 1938. Bencoolen. Journal of the Malayan Branch Royal Asiatic Society. 16(1): 127–133.
Overview of the British experience in Bencoolen

 
Former British colonies and protectorates in Asia
Provinces of Indonesia
1685 in the British Empire
States and territories established in 1967